Vinod  Nikole (15 September 1975 ) is an Indian politician and member of the 14th state Maharashtra Legislative Assembly. He represents the Dahanu constituency as member of Communist Party of India (Marxist).

References 

1975 births
Living people
Maharashtra MLAs 2019–2024
Communist Party of India (Marxist) politicians from Maharashtra
Marathi politicians